Shahr-e Koti (also Romanized as Shahr-e Kotī) is a village in Dabuy-ye Jonubi Rural District, Dabudasht District, Amol County, Mazandaran Province, Iran. At the 2006 census, its population was 93, in 24 families.

References 

Populated places in Amol County